Maryam Azmoon (born 10 November 1973) is a retired Iranian footballer, currently coaching the Iran women's national football team. She previously coached Kuwait.

References

External links 
 Azmoon at Soccerway

1973 births
Living people
Iranian women's footballers
Iran women's international footballers
Women's national association football team managers
Female association football managers
Iranian football managers
People from Rasht
Women's association footballers not categorized by position
Sportspeople from Gilan province